Ruben Ramolefi (born 17 July 1978) is a South African runner who specializes in the 3000 metres steeplechase and is currently the South African record holder in 3000 metres steeplechase. He also won the National Championship in 3000 metres steeplechase in 2004, 2005, 2006, 2007, 2008, 2009,  2010, 2011 and 2012.

Competition record

Personal bests
800 metres  - 1:47.60 min (2010) Potchefstroom
1500 metres - 3:41.84 min (2005) Oudtshoorn
One mile - 3.59.69 min (2011) Belville
2000 metres - 5:08.05 min(2006) Melbourne 	
3000 metres - 8:02.35 min (2006) Dakar
5000 metres - 13:53. min (2003) Durban
3000 metres steeplechase - 8:11.50 min (2011) Daegu

External links 

1978 births
Living people
South African male long-distance runners
Athletes (track and field) at the 2004 Summer Olympics
Athletes (track and field) at the 2008 Summer Olympics
Athletes (track and field) at the 2006 Commonwealth Games
Olympic athletes of South Africa
South African male steeplechase runners
Universiade medalists in athletics (track and field)
Universiade bronze medalists for South Africa
Medalists at the 2005 Summer Universiade
Commonwealth Games competitors for South Africa
Athletes (track and field) at the 2007 All-Africa Games
African Games competitors for South Africa